List of compositions by the English composer William Boyce (1711–1779).

Works

Vocal music

Services 
 Te Deum, G major, verse service (ca. 1725)
 Te Deum and Jubilate, A major, verse service (ca. 1740)
 Te Deum and Jubilate, A major, short service (ca. 1750)
 Burial Service, E minor, 4 voices (1751) for Captain T. Coram, 3 April 1751; ed. by J. Page, in Harmonia sacra, London, 1800
 Te Deum and Jubilate, C major, full service (ca. 1760)
 Kyrie, A major (????)
 Sanctus, A/G major (????)

Anthems 
 Begin unto my God with timbrels, verse (1769 or earlier, lost) text published in A Collection of Anthems used in His Majesty's Chapel Royal, London, 1769
 Behold O God our defender, full (1761) for the coronation of George III, 1761
 Be thou my judge, O Lord, verse (1749 or earlier)
 Blessed is he that considereth the poor, verse (????)
 Blessed is he that considereth the sick, verse, with orchestra (1741; pub. London, 1802)
 Blessed is the man that ferrets the Lord, verse (1736 or earlier)
 Blessing and glory, verse (1769 or earlier)
 By the waters of Babylon, verse (ca. 1740)
 Come, Holy Ghost, full (1761) for the coronation of George III, 1761
 Give the king thy judgements, verse (ca. 1740)
 Give the king thy judgements, verse (ca. 1760)
 Give unto the Lord, O ye mighty, verse (1736 or earlier)
 Great and marvellous are thy works, full (1769 or earlier, lost) text published in A Collection of Anthems used in His Majesty's Chapel Royal, London, 1769
 Hear my crying, verse (ca. 1740)
 Hear my prayer, full, with orchestra (ca. 1760)
 The heavens declare the glory of God, verse (1736) 
 Help me, O Lord, full (1726)
 How long wilt thou forget me, verse (1736 or earlier)
 How long wilt thou forget me, verse, incomplete (ca. 1740)
 I cried unto the Lord, verse (1736 or earlier)
 If we believe, verse (ca, 1745)
 I have set God always before me, verse (1749 or earlier)
 I have surely built thee a house, verse (1759) for reopening of St Margaret's, Westminster, 1759
 I was glad, full (1761) for the coronation of George III, 1761
 I will always give thanks, verse (1736 or earlier)
 I will magnify thee, O God, verse (1749 or earlier) ed. by J. Page, in Harmonia sacra, London, 1800
 The King shall rejoice, verse, with orchestra (1761) for the marriage of George III, 1761; ed. in Recent Researches in the Music of the Baroque Era, viii, 1970
 The King shall rejoice, full, with orchestra (1761) for the coronation of George III, 1761
 The King shall rejoice, verse, with orchestra (1766) for the Festival of the Sons of the Clergy, 1766
 Let my complaint come before thee, verse (1736 or earlier) ed. by J. Page, in Harmonia sacra, London, 1800
 Like as the hart, verse (ca. 1740)
 The Lord is a sun and a shield, full, with orchestra (1761) for the coronation of George III, 1761
 The Lord is full of compassion, verse (1736 or earlier)
 The Lord is King and hath put on glorious apparel, verse (1736 or earlier)
 The Lord is King be the people never so impatient, verse (1763) for thanksgiving for the Peace of Paris, 1763
 The Lord is my light and my salvation, verse (1749 or earlier)
 The Lord liveth, verse (1769 or earlier)
 Lord, teach us to number our days, verse (ca. 1750)
 Lord, thou hast been our refuge, verse, with orchestra (1755; pub. London, 1802)  for Festival of the Sons of the Clergy, 1755
 Lord, what is man that thou art mindful of him, verse (ca. 1740)
 Lord, what is man that thou shouldest visit him, verse (ca. 1770)
 Lord, who shall dwell in thy tabernacle, verse (1749 or earlier)
 My heart is fixed, verse (1749 or earlier, lost) text published in A Collection of Anthems used in His Majesty's Chapel Royal, London, 1769
 My heart is inditing, verse, with orchestra (1761) for the coronation of George III, 1761
 My heart rejoiceth in the Lord, verse (1769 or earlier, lost) text published in A Collection of Anthems used in His Majesty's Chapel Royal, London, 1769
 O be joyful in God all ye lands, verse (ca. 1735)
 O be joyful in God all ye lands, verse (1736 or earlier)
 O be jovful in God all ye lands, verse, with orchestra (1749; pub. London, 1752)
 O give thanks unto the Lord and call upon His name, verse (1736 or earlier)
 O give thanks unto the Lord, for he is gracious, verse (1762) for the birth of Prince George, 1762
 O praise the Lord, verse (ca. 1763)
 O sing unto the Lord a new song, verse (ca. 1740)
 O sing unto the Lord a new song, verse (1749 or earlier, lost) text published in A Collection of Anthems used in His Majesty's Chapel Royal, London, 1769
 O where shall wisdom be found?, verse (1769 or earlier)
 Ponder my words, verse (1745 or earlier)
 Praise the Lord, O Jerusalem, full, with orchestra (1761) for the coronation of George III, 1761
 Praise the Lord, ye servants, verse (1749 or earlier)
 Save me, O God, full (ca. 1735)
 Sing, O heavens, verse (ca. 1763)
 Sing praises unto the Lord, verse (1736 or earlier)
 Sing unto the Lord (????)
 The souls of the righteous, full, with orchestra (1760) for the funeral of George II, 1760 [Ov. pub. in Musica Britannica, vol. 13, 1957; complete ed. in Recent Researches in the Music of the Baroque Era, vii, 1970]
 Teach me, O Lord, the way of thy statutes, verse (1736 or earlier)
 Turn thee unto me, full (1736 or earlier)
 Turn thee unto me, verse (1749 or earlier)
 Unto thee, O Lord, verse (1749 or earlier, lost) text published in A Collection of Anthems used in His Majesty's Chapel Royal, London, 1769
 Wherewithal shall a young man cleanse his way, verse (1749 or earlier)

Chants and hymns 
 Double Psalm Chant, D major (????)
 Double Psalm Chant, F major (????)
 Chant, D major, Divine Harmony (1770) doubtful, attributed to Mr. Davis
 Faint is my head and sick my heart (????)
 Hosanna to the King (????)
 How long O my God shall I plead (????)
 I'll celebrate thy praises, Lord (????)
 Lord, how my bosom foes increase (????)
 The Lord my pasture shall prepare (????)
 The Lord does them support that fall (????)
 The man is blest of God through Christ (????)
 O God who dost for ever live (????)
 Servant of God, well done (????)
 To the call of pressing need (????)
 Weigh the words of my profession (????)
 When rising from the bed of death (????)
 To Sion's hill I lift my eyes (????)

Other sacred works 
 David's Lamentation over Saul and Jonathan, sacred cantata, solo voices, chorus, orchestra (1736) (text: J. Lockman)
 Lo! On the Thorny bed of care (????)
 Noah: An oratorio (????, lost)
 Vital spark of heavenly repair (????)
 Hither, ye sons of harmony repair ('Monumental inscription to the memory of Mr. Gostling, late minor canon of the Cathedral of Canterbury'), 4 voices and basso continuo (ca. 1777) (text: J. Hawkins)
 O how perverse is flesh and blood, partsong (ca. 1725)
 also 12 hymns published in 18th-century anthologies

Theatre works 
 Peleus and Thetis, masque (by 1740) (text: G. Granville, Lord Lansdowne) [Overture pub. in Musica Britannica, vol. 13, 1957]
 Secular Masque (1745; fp. 1750) (text: J. Dryden) [Ov. pub. as Overture No. 6 in 12 Overtures, 1770]
 The Chaplet, musical entertainment in 2 parts (fp. 1749) (text: M. Mendez) [Overture pub. as Symphony No. 3 in 8 Symphonys, 1760]
 The Shepherd's Lottery, musical entertainment in 2 parts (fp. 1751) (text: M. Mendez) [Overture pub. as Symphony No. 4 in 8 Symphonys, 1760]
 The Tempest, masque (fp. 1757) (text: D. Garrick, after Shakespeare)
 Harlequin's Invasion, or A Christmas Gambol, pantomime (fp. 1759) (text: Garrick) a collaboration with M. Arne and T. Aylward
 Heart of Oak [The official march of the Royal Navy; originally written as part of Harlequin's Invasion]

Music in other theatre works 
 Dirge (in Cymbeline, tragedy; Shakespeare) (1746)
 2 Songs (in Lethe, or Aesop in the Shades, farce; D. Garrick) (1749)
 Instrumental music (in The Roman Father, tragedy; W. Whitehead) (1750, lost)
 Pastoral interlude (in The Rehearsal, or Bays in Petticoats, comedy; Clive (1750)
 Dirge (in Romeo and Juliet, tragedy; Garrick, after Shakespeare) (1750)
 Song (in The Conscious Lovers, comedy; R. Steele) (ca. 1752)
 Song (in The Gamester, tragedy; E. Moore) (Feb 1753)
 Instrumental music (in Boadicea, tragedy; R. Glover) (1753, lost)
 Music for animating the statue, 3-pt song (in Florizel and Perdita, or The Winter's Tale, comedy; Garrick, after Shakespeare) (1756)
 2 Songs, duet (in Amphitryon, comedy; J. Hawkesworth, after J. Dryden) (1756)
 2 Odes (in Agis, tragedy; J. Home) (1758)
 Other songs by Boyce adapted in: The Temple of Peace (1749); Midas (1762); Love in the Village (1762); The Royal Chase (ca. 1765); The Summer's Tale (1765); The Disappointment, or The Force of Credulity (1767); Tom Jones (1769); Harlequin's Museum, or Mother Shipton Triumphant (1792)

Court odes 
 Pierian sisters hail the morn, ode for the King's Birthday, 1755 [Overture pub. in Musica Britannica, vol. 13, 1957]
 Hail! hail! auspicious day, ode for New Year's Day, 1756 [Overture pub. as Symphony No. 1 in 8 Symphonys, 1760]
 When Caesar's natal day, ode for the King's Birthday, 1756 [Overture pub. as Symphony No. 2 in 8 Symphonys, 1760]
 While Britain, in her monarch blest, ode for New Year's Day, 1757
 Rejoice, ye Britons, hail the day!, ode for the King's Birthday, 1757
 Behold, the circle forms! prepare!, ode for New Year's Day, 1758 [Overture pub. in Musica Britannica, vol. 13, 1957]
 When Othbert left the Italian plain, ode for the King's Birthday, 1758 [Ov. pub. as Overture No. 7 in 12 Overtures, 1770, with music from 1765 New Year's ode; also in Musica Britannica, vol. 13, 1957]
 Ye guardian powers, to whose command, ode for New Year's Day, 1759 [1st 2 mvts of overture the same as those of Behold, the circle forms, 1758]
 Begin the song – ye subject choirs, ode for the King's Birthday, 1759
 Again the sun's revolving sphere, ode for New Year's Day, 1760 [Overture pub. in Musica Britannica, vol. 13, 1957]
 Still must the muse, indignant hear, ode for New Year's Day, 1761
 'Twas at the nectar'd feast of Jove, ode for the King's Birthday, 1761 [Ov. pub. as Overture No. 8 in 12 Overtures, 1770]
 God of slaughter, quit the scene, ode for New Year's Day, 1762 [Ov. pub. as Overture No. 5 in 12 Overtures, 1770]
 Go, Flora, said the impatient queen, ode for the King's Birthday, 1762 [Ov. pub. as Overture No. 1 in 12 Overtures, 1770]
 At length the imperious lord of war, ode for New Year's Day, 1763 [Ov. pub. as Overture No. 3 in 12 Overtures, 1770]
 Common births, like common things, ode for the King's Birthday, 1763
 To wedded love the song shall flow, ode for the King's Birthday, 1764 [Ov. pub. as Overture No. 10 in 12 Overtures, 1770]
 Sacred to thee, O commerce, ode for New Year's Day, 1765 [Ov. pub. as Overture No. 7 in 12 Overtures, 1770, with music from 1758 Birthday ode]
 Hail to the rosy morn, ode for the King's Birthday, 1765 [Ov. pub. as Overture No. 2 in 12 Overtures, 1770]
 Hail to the man, so sings the Hebrew bard, ode for the King's Birthday, 1766 [Ov. pub. as Overture No. 11 in 12 Overtures, 1770]
 When first the rude o’erpeopled north, ode for New Year's Day, 1767 [Ov. pub. as Overture No. 12 in 12 Overtures, 1770]
 Friend to the poor! for sure, O king, ode for the King's Birthday, 1767
 Let the voice of music breathe, ode for New Year's Day, 1768 [Ov. pub. as Overture No. 9 in 12 Overtures, 1770]
 Prepare, prepare your songs of praise, ode for the King's Birthday, 1768 [Overture pub. in Musica Britannica, vol. 13, 1957]
 Patron of arts! at length by thee, ode for the King's Birthday, 1769 [Overture pub. in Musica Britannica, vol. 13, 1957]
 Forward, Janus, turn thine eyes, ode for New Year's Day, 1770 [Overture pub. in Musica Britannica, vol. 13, 1957]
 Discord, hence! the torch resign, ode for the King's Birthday, 1770 [Overture pub. in Musica Britannica, vol. 13, 1957]
 Again returns the circling year, ode for New Year's Day, 1771 [Overture pub. in Musica Britannica, vol. 13, 1957]
 Long did the churlish East detain, ode for the King's Birthday, 1771 [Overture pub. in Musica Britannica, vol. 13, 1957]
 At length the fleeting year is o’er, ode for New Year's Day, 1772 [Overture pub. in Musica Britannica, vol. 13, 1957]
 From scenes of death, and deep distress, ode for the King's Birthday, 1772 [Overture pub. in Musica Britannica, vol. 13, 1957]
 Wrapt in stole of sable train, ode for New Year's Day, 1773
 Born for millions are the kings, ode for the King's Birthday, 1773
 Pass but a few short fleeting years, ode for New Year's Day, 1774
 Hark! or does the muse's ear, ode for the King's Birthday, 1774
 Ye powers, who rule o’er states and kings, ode for the King's Birthday, 1775 [Overture pub. in Musica Britannica, vol. 13, 1957]
 On the white rocks which guard her coast, ode for New Year's Day, 1776
 Ye western gales, whose genial breath, ode for the King's Birthday, 1776
 Again imperial winter's sway, ode for New Year's Day, 1777 [Overture pub. in Musica Britannica, vol. 13, 1957]
 Driven out from heaven's ethereal domes, ode for the King's Birthday, 1777
 When rival nations great in arms, ode for New Year's Day, 1778
 Arm’d with her native force, behold, ode for the King's Birthday, 1778
 To arms, to arms ye sons of might, ode for New Year's Day, 1779 [overture same as Pierian sisters, 1755; pub. in Musica Britannica, vol. 13, 1957]

Other odes 
 The charms of harmony display, ode for St Cecilia's Day, ca. 1738 (text: P. Vidal) [Overture pub. in Musica Britannica, vol. 13, 1957]
 See fam’d Apollo and the Nine, ode for St Cecilia's Day, 1739 (text: J. Lockman) [Overture pub. as Symphony No. 5 in 8 Symphonys, 1760; also pub. in Musica Britannica, vol. 13, 1957]
 Gentle lyre, begin the strain (1740) (text: The Pythian Ode; W. Hart, after Pindar) [Overture pub. as Symphony No. 7 in 8 Symphonys, 1760]
 Here all thy active fires diffuse, ode for the installation of Duke of Newcastle as Chancellor of University of Cambridge (1749) (text: W. Mason)
 Strike, strike the lyre, ode for the birthday of Frederick, Prince of Wales, 1750?
 Who but remembers yesterday (Britain's Isle), ode on the death of Frederick, Prince of Wales, 1751
 Let grief subside, ode for the birthday of George, Prince of Wales, 1751
 Another passing year is flown, ode for the birthday of George, Prince of Wales, 1752 (text: W. Harvard)
 Titles and ermine fall behind, ode in commemoration of Shakespeare, Drury Lane, 1756 (text: Havard)
 Cetra de canti amica, ode (1757) in Del canzoniere d'Orazio di Giovan Gualberto Bottarelli (1757)
 Degli amor la madre altera, ode (1757) in Del canzoniere d'Orazio di Giovan Gualberto Bottarelli (1757)
 Arise, immortal Shakespeare rise (1759?) (text: D. Garrick)
 See, white-robed peace, ode for the Seven Years' War, 1763 (text: D. Mallet)
 Lo, on the thorny bed of care (Ode to Charity), soli, chorus and orch, sacred ode for Leicester Infirmary, 1774 (text: J. Cradock)
 Vital spark of heavenly flame (The Dying Christian to his Soul), sacred ode (????) (text: A. Pope)
 In elder time, ode (????, lost)

Cantatas, serenades and dialogues 
 Ah whither, whither would Achilles flee (Deidamia's parting with Achilles upon the siege of Troy), voice and orchestra (ca. 1735)
 Through flowery meads, cantata, 2 voices and orchestra (ca. 1735)
 Gentle zephyrs smoothly rove, serenade, voice and orchestra (ca. 1735)
 When the celestial beauties strove, cantata, 2 voices (ca. 1735)
 Young Damon, fired with amorous heat, cantata, 2 voices (ca. 1735)
 Solomon, serenata, 2 voices, chorus and orchestra (1743) (text: E. Moore) [Ov. pub. as Sym No. 6 in 8 Symphonys, 1760] complete ed. in Musica Britannica, vol. 68
 Long with undistinguished flame, cantata (????) (text: C. Smart)  in Lyra britannica, vol. 1, London, 1747
 Tell me ye brooks, cantata (????) (text: W. Congreve) in Lyra britannica, ii, London, 1747
 Blest in Maria's friendship, cantata (????) in Lyra britannica, iii, London, 1748
 Let rakes for pleasure range the town (Johnny and Jenny), dialogue, 2 voices (1748) (text: Moore)
 Did you not once, Lucinda vow, dialogue, 2 voices and orchestra (ca. 1750)
 Thus on a bed of dew bespangled flowers (Thyrsis), cantata (ca. 1750)
 By Danae's progeny (Danae), cantata, voice and orchestra (ca. 1750)
 Blate Jonny (A Scots Cantata) (ca. 1756) (text: A. Ramsay) in Lyra britannica, v, London, 1756
 Haste, haste every nymph, dialogue, voice and orchestra (ca. 1759) in Lyra britannica, vi, London, 1759
 Thou rising sun (The Lapland Cantata) (ca. 1759) (text: A. Philips) in Lyra britannica, vi, London, 1759
 The inconstant swain (????, lost)

Glees, catches and rounds 
 A blooming youth
 Genius of harmony
 Glory be to God on high
 Hallelujah
 Here's to thee Dick
 John Cooper
 Long live King George
 'Mongst other roses
 ’Tis on earth
 ’Tis thus, thus and thus farewell

Solo songs 
 Again to the garden
 Age in LB, vol. 1, London, 1747
 Ah Chloe! thou treasure
 Ah whither, whither would Achilles flee
 Alas how slowly minutes roll
 Amaz'd, their unfrequented fanes in LB, vol. 2, London, 1747
 As Damon stood in pensive mood in LB, vol. 2, London, 1747
 As Phillis the gay
 As Thyrsis reclined
 At Ross how alter’d is the scene!
 Beneath my feet when Flora cast (????, lost)
 Bid me when forty winters more
 Boast not mistaken swain
 Can nothing, nothing move her
 Castalio’s Complaint (set to musick by Mr. Boyce) in Calliope, 1739
 Cease vainglorious swain
 Come all ye young lovers
 Come all ye youths
 The Distracted Lover in Calliope, 1739
 Each hour Mariana
 Fair Eliza beauteous creature
 The flame of love
 Flora, goddess sweetly blooming
 Go, virgin kid
 Goddess of ease
 The heavenly hours are almost past
 How blest has my time been, first version
 How blest has my time been, second version
 How hard is the fortune of all womankind, 2 voices and b.c. in LB, vol. 1, London, 1747
 How wretched is a maiden’s fate
 I looked, and I sighed
 I love, I doat, first version
 I love, I doat, second version
 If you my wand’ring heart would find
 In vain Philander
 In vain would honour love undo!
 Jessy, or The happy pair in LB, vol. 2, London, 1747
 Long detained by winds contrary
 Lost to the joys of life is he in LB, vol. 2, London, 1747
 Love bids me go
 Love’s no irregular desire
 The man that says Dick Leveridge stinks
 The Modest Petition (words by T. Phillips) in Calliope, 1739
 My Florio
 Near Thames’ green banks
 Near to the silent shady grove
 No more shall meads
 The nymph that I loved
 O nightingale
 Of all the torments, all the cares (The rival or desponding lover) in Calliope, 1739
 Of roses, while I wove
 Oft’ am I by the women told
 On a bank beside a willow
 On thy banks, gentle Stour, song in LB, vol. 1, London, 1747
 One summer's morning
 Parent of blooming flowers (lost)
 Rail no more ye learned asses
 The ravish'd lover (When Fanny blooming fair), song (text: T. Phillips)
 Saw you Phoebe pass this way
 She's blest with wit
 The silent lover in LB, vol. 1, London, 1747
 Silvia the fair (Fair Silvia) in Calliope, 1739
 Since I with Chloe last was seen
 Since nature mankind for society fram’d, part song in LB, vol. 2, London, 1747
 The song of Diana (With horns and with hounds), voice and b.c. (from Dryden's Secular Masque) in LB, vol. 1, London, 1747
 The song of Momus to Mars (The sword within the scabbard keep), voice and b.c. (from Dryden's Secular Masque) in LB, vol. 1, London, 1747'''
 The song of Venus in LB, vol. 1, London, 1747 Song sent with a lady's kid glove in LB, vol. 2, London, 1747 The sun now darts fainter his rays
 Tell me lovely loving pair
 Tell me no more I am deceiv’d, song in LB, vol. 1, London, 1747 Tell me, ye brooks, where can my darling hide? in LB, vol. 2, London, 1747 Tho’ Chloe's out of fashion
 To Harriote all accomplished fair
 To make the wife kind, and to keep the house still (The Happy Happy He), song (1748) (text: Moore)
 To sooth my heart
 ’Twas summer time
 Venus to sooth my heart
 Well-judging Phyllis in LB, vol. 1, London, 1747 What though you cannot move her
 When Chloe frowning bids me go
 When Fanny/Cloe, blooming fair
 When first on her my eyes were thrown
 When I but dream of her
 When mariners long wind-bound
 When Orpheus went down
 When the nymphs were contending
 When young and artless as the lamb
 While on my Colin's knee I sit
 Who but remembers yesterday
 Why treat me still with cold disdain?
 Would we attain the happiest state
 You say you love
 Young Phillis, one morningLB – Lyra Britannica: Being a Collection of Songs, Duets, and Cantatas, on Various Subjects 3 volumes (J. Walsh, 1747)

Calliope – Calliope, or English Harmony. A Collection, 1739

Instrumental music

Orchestra 
 8 Symphonies in 8 Parts, op. 2 (pub. London, 1760) overtures from other odes and theater works
 Symphony No. 1, B-flat major, 2 oboes, strings & b.c. [Overture to ode for the New Year, 1756]
 Symphony No. 2, A major, 2 oboes, strings & b.c. [Overture to ode for the King's Birthday, 1756]
 Symphony No. 3, C major, 2 oboes, strings & b.c. [Overture to The Chaplet, pastoral opera, 1749]
 Symphony No. 4, F major, 2 oboes, 2 horns, 2 bassoons, strings & b.c. [Overture to Shepherd’s Lottery, pastoral opera, 1751]
 Symphony No. 5, D major, 2 oboes, 2 trumpets, timpani, strings & b.c. [Overture to ode for St. Cecilia's Day, 1739]
 Symphony No. 6, F major, 2 oboes, strings & b.c. [Overture to Solomon, serenata, 1742]
 Symphony No. 7, B-flat major, 2 oboes, strings & b.c. [Overture to the Pythian Ode, 1740–41]
 Symphony No. 8, D minor, 2 oboes, strings & b.c. [Worcester Overture]
 12 Overtures in 7, 9, 10 and 12 Parts (pub. London, 1770) overtures from other odes and theater works
 No. 1, D major, 2 oboes, strings & b.c. [Overture to ode for the King's Birthday, 1762]
 No. 2, G major, 2 flutes, 2 oboes, bassoon, strings & b.c. [Overture to ode for the King's Birthday, 1765]
 No. 3, B-flat major, 2 oboes, 2 bassoons (opt.), strings & b.c. [Overture to ode for New Year's Day, 1763]
 No. 4, D major, 2 oboes, bassoon, 2 horns, 2 trumpets, timpani, strings & b.c.
 No. 5, F major, 2 oboes, strings & b.c. [Overture to ode for New Year's Day, 1762, with new 2nd mvt]
 No. 6, D minor, 2 flutes, 2 oboes, 2 horns, strings & b.c. [Overture to Secular Masque’’, 1745]
 No. 7, G major, 2 oboes, strings & b.c. [taken from both ode for the King’s Birthday, 1758, and ode for New Year’s Day, 1765]
 No. 8, D major, 2 flutes, 2 oboes, 2 horns, 2 trumpets, timpani, strings & b.c. [Overture to ode for the King’s Birthday, 1761]
 No. 9, A major, 2 oboes, strings & b.c. [Overture to ode for New Year’s Day, 1768]
 No. 10, F major, 2 oboes, bassoon, 2 horns, strings & b.c. [Overture to ode for the King’s Birthday, 1764]
 No. 11, D major, 2 oboes, 2 trumpets, timpani, strings & b.c. [Overture to ode for the King’s Birthday, 1766]
 No. 12, G major, 2 oboes, bassoon, 2 horns, strings & b.c. [Overture to ode for New Year’s Day, 1767]
 Concerto, D minor (The Worcester Overture) (????) [pub. as Symphony No. 8 in 8 Symphonies, 1760]
 Concerto grosso, B minor (????)
 3 Concerti grossi, B-flat major, D minor (incomplete), E minor (????)
 Concerto, bassoon (1742, lost) performed at Castle Tavern, London, 11 August 1742 Instrumental 
 3 Sonatas, 2 violins and basso continuo (ca. 1740)
 Overture, C major (ca. 1740) keyboard score only''
 12 Sonatas, 2 violins, cello, harpsichord (pub. London, 1747)
 10 voluntaries, organ/harpsichord (pub. London, 1779)

References

Lists of compositions by composer